The Lewes and Rehoboth Canal is a canal in Sussex County,  Delaware, which connects the Broadkill River and the Delaware Bay to Rehoboth Bay.  It forms a portion of the Intracoastal Waterway.

History
Originally proposed in 1803, the canal was finally constructed by the Army Corps of Engineers from 1913 to 1916. Despite its intended use as a freight shipment route, it saw little use for that purpose due to the development of more efficient roads and railways; instead, the canal has primarily been used for leisure boating for the majority of its history.

See also

 Lewes, Delaware
 Rehoboth Bay, Delaware
 Rehoboth Beach, Delaware

References

External links
Some photos taken alongside the canal (from Flickr)
 - Southern terminus
 - Northern terminus

Buildings and structures in Lewes, Delaware
Canals in Delaware
Transportation buildings and structures in Sussex County, Delaware
Canals opened in 1929